Wildcat Brook, also known as the Wildcat River, is a  stream in the White Mountains of New Hampshire, in the United States. It rises at Carter Notch in the township of Bean's Purchase in Coos County, and flows south through the town of Jackson in Carroll County to its confluence with the Ellis River near the town's southern boundary. The surrounding area is part of the Jackson Falls Historic District.

Via the Ellis River, Wildcat Brook is part of the Saco River watershed, with its waters reaching the Atlantic Ocean near Biddeford, Maine. The entire brook, from Carter Notch to the Ellis River, is part of the designated National Wild and Scenic River System, as are its tributaries Little Wildcat Brook, Bog Brook, and Great Brook.

See also

List of rivers in New Hampshire

References

Rivers of New Hampshire
Wild and Scenic Rivers of the United States
Rivers of Carroll County, New Hampshire
Rivers of Coös County, New Hampshire